The Foreign Sports Talent Scheme is used by sports officials and organizations in Singapore to scout and facilitate the migration of non-Singaporeans deemed to possess sports talent to play in Singapore colours in sporting events. Introduced in 1993 by the Singapore Table Tennis Association, it also aimed to boost local sporting standards by importing sporting expertise.

In March 2008, it was announced in the Parliament of Singapore that 54 athletes had benefited from the programme and received Singapore citizenship, of which 37 were still in active training.

Athletics
Zhang Guirong
Dong Enxin (returned to native country)
Du Xianhui
Luan Wei
E Xiaoxu

Billiards
Peter Gilchrist

Badminton
Danny Bawa Chrisnanta
Dellis Yuliana
Hendra Wijaya
Hendri Saputra
Jiang Yanmei
Li Yujia
Liu Fan
Robin Gonansa
Ronald Susilo
Shinta Mulia Sari
Chayut Triyachart (retired due to injury)
Febriyan Irvannaldy (returned to native country)
Fu Mingtian (retired, became badminton coach and returned to native country)
Gu Juan
Huang Chao (retired due to injury)
Li Li (quit national team and returned to native country)
Xiao Luxi (returned to native country)
Xing Aiying (retired due to injury)
Yao Lei (quit national team and returned to native country)
Zhang Beiwen (dropped by Singapore Badminton Association)
Zhou Lei

Basketball
Li Ling (Switched to national netball team in 2005 and retired in 2011)
Zhao Jing
Li Lin (left Singapore)
Yao Xiuxiu (in Singapore)
Zhang Shu (left Singapore)

Chess
Wu Shaobin

Football
Egmar Goncalves (returned to native country)
Mirko Grabovac
Daniel Bennett
Agu Casmir
Itimi Dickson
Shi Jiayi
Mustafic Fahrudin
Precious Emuejeraye
Qiu Li

Hockey
Chen Huiling
Li Ying
Ma Xiaomeng
Niu Lei
Qi Hui (retired in 2007)
Zhang Jun

Water polo
Luo Nan

Table tennis
Cai Xiaoli (retired in 2011 and became the assistant coach of the national women's team)
Chen Feng (retired in 2017)
Feng Tianwei
Gao Ning (retired in 2018 and became the head coach of the national men's team)
Lin Ye (table tennis)
Li Hu (sacked in 2016)
Yu Mengyu (retired in 2022)
Duan Yongjun (retired)
Jing Junhong (retired – moved to Singapore prior to introduction of FST, but citizenship was fast-tracked)
Li Jiawei (retired in 2012, returned to Beijing)
Ma Liang (retired, stayed in Singapore as coach)
Sun Beibei (retired in 2012, stayed in Singapore as coach)
Wang Yuegu (retired in 2012, stayed in Singapore as coach)
Xu Yan (returned to native country)
Yang Zi (retired in 2017)
Zeng Jian
Zhan Jian (retired in 2015)
Zhang Taiyong (retired)
Zhang Xueling (returned to native country)
Zhou Yihan

References

Foreign Sports Talent Scheme
Foreign Sports Talent Scheme
Sport in Singapore